Indiana University Health Methodist Hospital is a hospital part of Indiana University Health, located in Indianapolis, state of Indiana, United States. It is the largest hospital in the state of Indiana and one of only four regional Level I Trauma Centers in the state. It has 625 staffed beds and is one of the largest teaching hospitals in the area.

The hospital specializes in numerous treatment areas, including adult cardiovascular services provided in the new Clarian Cardiovascular Center. Methodist physicians and staff performed the first open-heart surgery in Indiana in 1965. The hospital system is also considered a neurosurgery center of excellence, as well as an expert in organ transplantation, urology, neurology, orthopedics and pediatrics. Indiana’s first medical helicopter, the LifeLine helicopter ambulance, was based at Methodist and flew its first mission in 1979 from the hospital's helipad. The hospital also houses the Indiana Poison Center. In 2004, Clarian Health became Indiana's first magnet hospital system.

Indiana University Health operates the Methodist Hospital, Indiana University Hospital and Riley Hospital for Children, which were all connected by the Indiana University Health People Mover.

Methodist Hospital is the official hospital for the Indianapolis Motor Speedway: all drivers injured at the Indianapolis 500 and Brickyard 400 are transported there for treatment.  As well, it is also the official hospital for the NHRA during the U.S. Nationals. In 2017, Sebastien Bourdais was hospitalized at Indiana University Health Methodist Hospital after an accident during qualifications for the 101st Running of the Indianapolis 500.

The hospital has been ranked in the top 50 hospitals in the United States for 10 consecutive years.

The former Vice President of the United States James Danforth Quayle was born at Methodist Hospital in 1947.

See also
List of hospitals in Indianapolis
List of stroke centers in the United States
List of trauma centers in the United States

References

External links

Teaching hospitals in Indiana
Hospitals in Indiana
Healthcare in Indianapolis
Trauma centers